Maisie Raine is a British television crime drama series, first broadcast on BBC One, that ran from 28 July 1998 to 9 July 1999. Pauline Quirke stars as the eponymous title character, an unorthodox detective whose hands on yet down-to-earth approach is not always appreciated by her superiors. Created by Stephen Bill, a total of twelve episodes were broadcast across two series. The first series features a running story arc involving Maisie's wayward brother Kelvin (Paul Reynolds), and had a much lighter feel than the second, which featured grittier storylines including drug dealing, armed robbery, arson and murder.

Throughout the series, Maisie is portrayed as a strong and dedicated detective, often stepping on toes and bending the rules to get results, and even becoming personally involved with the victims of each case. She often clashes with her superior officer, Jack Freeman (Ian McElhinney), who also appears to hold a romantic torch for her, while George Kyprianou (Steve John Shepherd), a junior constable on her team, often proves to be her best ally in the field. Maisie also receives help from her loyal housekeeper Joan (Stella Moray). Although neither series has been released on DVD, repeats of the series are regularly shown on Drama and Alibi.

Cast
 Pauline Quirke as DI Maisie Raine
 Ian McElhinney as DCS Jack Freeman
 Anna Patrick as DCI Susan Askey (Series 1)
 Richard Graham as DS Mickey Farrel
 Rakie Ayola as DC Helen Tomlin
 Steve John Shepherd as DC George Kyprianou
 Brian Bovell as DC Stephen Holmes (Series 1)
 Dean Lennox Kelly as DC Chris Mallory (Series 2)
 Paul Reynolds as Kelvin Raine (Series 1)
 Stella Moray as Joan Hobson (Series 2)

Episodes

Series 1 (1998)

Series 2 (1999)

References

External links

1998 British television series debuts
1999 British television series endings
1990s British crime drama television series
1990s British mystery television series
1990s British police procedural television series
1990s British workplace drama television series
BBC crime television shows
BBC mystery television shows
BBC television dramas
British detective television series
English-language television shows
Television shows set in England